Throwed in da Game is the second studio album by the American rapper Fat Pat, released in 1998. Like Ghetto Dreams, Throwed in da Game was a posthumous release. The album peaked at No. 40 on Billboard's Top R&B Albums chart.

Track listing
 "Throwed N Da Game" (featuring Double D, Chikken Hawk & Noke D)
 "Fat Pat (Interview)"       
 "Jammin' Screw"
 "Head & Shouldaz" (featuring Sean Pymp, D-Gotti, Noke D & Chikken Hawk)
 "Dirty South" (featuring Dren, Double D, E.S.G. & Big Steve)
 "I'm A Slicka" (featuring City Slickas)
 "If You Only Knew" (featuring Celicia Ward)
 "Do What You Wanna Do" (featuring D-Gotti, Tyte Eyez & E.S.G.)
 "Sacrificez" (featuring D-Gotti, Dren, Double D & Big Hawk)
 "Jus Ride" (featuring Double D, Mr. 3-2 & Pymp Tyte)
 "Wreckshop" (featuring Pymp Tyte & D-Gotti)
 "2000" (featuring D-Gotti, Double D, Big Steve & D-Wreck)
 "I'm So Fly" (featuring Ronnie Spencer)
 "I.O.U." (featuring Pymp Tyte)
 "Dreamz" (featuring Big Hawk & Mack)
 "Supa Hoe Layer" (featuring Double D, Big Steve & Noke D)
 "Holla At Cha Later" (featuring Chikken Hawk, D-Gotti, Double D, South Park Mexican, Tyte Eyes)

References

1998 albums
Fat Pat (rapper) albums